Danon The Kid ( foaled 29 January 2018) is a Japanese Thoroughbred racehorse. He was one of the best two-year-olds in Japan in 2020 when he won all three of his races including the Tokyo Sports Hai Nisai Stakes and the Hopeful Stakes. In 2021 he finished third in the Mile Championship.

Background
Danon The Kid is a bay colt bred in Japan by Northern Farm. As a yearling in 2017 he was consigned to the Select Sale and was bought for ¥108,000,000 by Danox Co Ltd. The colt was sent into training with Takayuki Yasuda.

He was from the third crop of foals sired by Just A Way, who won the Tenno Sho, Dubai Duty Free Stakes and Yasuda Kinen and was rated the best racehorse in the world in 2014. His other progeny have included the Fillies' Revue winner Epos and Velox who was placed in all three legs of the Japanese Triple Crown.

Danon The Kid's dam Epic Love was an Irish-bred mare who showed high-class form in France, winning the Prix Vanteaux and finishing second in the Prix Saint-Alary. Her granddam Alcando was a very successful racemare who won the Firth of Clyde Stakes in Scotland, the Prix de Psyche in France and the Beverly Hills Handicap in California. Alacndo was descended from the Irish broodmare Charwoman (foaled in 1933), making her a distant relative of May Hill.

Racing career

2020: two-year-old season
Danon The Kid made his racecourse debut at Hanshin Racecourse on 28 June when he was ridden by Yuichi Kitamura in a race for newcomers over 1800 metres on good ground. Starting the 3.7/1 second favourite in a fourteen-runner field he raced in third place before taking the lead in the straight and drawing away to win by three lengths from Wonderful Town. After the summer break the colt returned to the track for the Grade 3 Tokyo Sports Hai Nisai Stakes over 1800 metres at Tokyo Racecourse on 23 November and started the 0.7/1 favourite against nine opponents. Ridden by Yuga Kawada he was restrained in third place before making rapid progress to take the lead 300 metres from the finish and won by one and a quarter lengths from Titleholder with Jun Blue Sky in third.

For his third and final run of the year Danon The Kid was stepped up in class and distance to contest the Grade 1 Hopeful Stakes over 2000 metres at Nakayama Racecourse on 26 December. Ridden by Kawada he went off the 1.1/1 favourite in a fifteen-runner field which also included the undefeated colts Land of Liberty, Orthoclase and Yoho Lake. He raced just behind the leaders as Land of Liberty set the pace from Titleholder, Orthoclase and Vanishing Point before the complexion of the race changed abruptly on the final turn as Land of Liberty veered to the left and was pulled up by his jockey. Danon The Kid took the lead on the outside in the straight and rallied after being headed by Orthoclase to regain the advantage in the last 100 metres and win by one and a quarter lengths. Kawada said after the race "The stable staff did a great job in tuning up the colt and he ran much better than he did in his previous start but still, he couldn't find a good rhythm and was not steady in the last two corners today. There is still a lot of room for improvement and we intend to work hard so he can kick off a good three-year-old campaign."

In January 2021 Danon The Kid was voted Best Two-Year-Old Colt at the JRA Awards for 2020, taking 262 of the 283 votes. In the official Japanese rankings Danon The Kid was rated the best two-year-old colt of 2020, one pound ahead of Grenadier Guards.

2021: three-year-old season
On 7 March Danon The Kid began his second campaign in the Grade 2 Yayoi Sho over 2000 metres at Nakayama and started the 0.3/1 favourite against nine opponents. Ridden by Kawada he settled in fourth place before making progress in the straight but was never able to reach the leaders and sustained his first defeat as he finished third behind Titleholder and Schnell Meister. Yasuda later commented "He didn't quite get into the flow of things, and the pace was slow". Despite his defeat the colt started favourite for the Grade 1 Satsuki Sho over the same course and distance on 18 April. He raced just behind the leaders for most of the way but after being switched to the outside in the straight he tired badly and came home fifteenth of the sixteen runners behind Efforia.

Danon The Kid was off the track for more than six months before returning in the Grade 2 Fuji Stakes over 1600 metres at Tokyo on 23 October and finishing fourth behind the filly Songline. Four weeks later the colt was moved back into Grade 1 company for the all-aged Mile Championship over 1600 metres at Tokyo. Starting a 15.1/1 outsider he raced in eighth place before coming on strongly in the straight to take third place behind Gran Alegria and Schnell Meister beaten just over a length by the winner.

Pedigree

References

2018 racehorse births
Racehorses bred in Japan
Racehorses trained in Japan
Thoroughbred family 15-a